Waverley College is a dual-campus independent Catholic early learning, primary and secondary day school for boys, located on Birrell and Henrietta Street in Waverley, in the eastern suburbs of Sydney, New South Wales, Australia. The school was founded by the Congregation of Christian Brothers in 1903 and is operated in the tradition of Blessed Edmund Rice through its membership of Edmund Rice Education Australia.

The non-selective College caters for approximately 1,400 students from early learning; and Year 5 to Year 12 across two campuses.

History 
The school was founded in 1903; opening with 20 students, operating from a house in Salisbury Street, ‘Airmount’, until proper facilities could be constructed. A purpose-built school house was finished in 1903 and expanded with an additional two floors by 1919.

In 1938, the school started accepting boarders. The school's boarders came from rural New South Wales, Victoria, Queensland, Papua New Guinea, Hong Kong, Malaysia, Norfolk Island, Nauru, New Caledonia, Saigon and Singapore. The school stopped taking boarders in 1979.

Affiliations 
Waverley College a member of the Combined Associated Schools (CAS) in NSW. Other members include Barker College, Cranbrook School, Knox Grammar School, St. Aloysius’ College and Trinity Grammar School. This membership provides students with access to academic and sporting competition.

Waverley College is also affiliated with the Association of Heads of Independent Schools of Australia (AHISA), the Junior School Heads Association of Australia (JSHAA), and the Catholic Secondary Schools Association NSW/ACT (CSSA).

Sport 
Waverley College is a member of the Combined Associated Schools (CAS).

CAS premierships 
Waverley College has won the following CAS premierships.

 Athletics (25) - 1944, 1945, 1947, 1949, 1950, 1953, 1954, 1956, 1958, 1960, 1963, 1964, 1965, 1974, 1975, 1976, 1977, 1978, 1979, 1980, 1981, 1982, 1993, 1994, 1995
 Australian Football (2) - 2019, 2020
 Basketball (5) - 1992, 1994, 1995, 1998, 2006
 Cricket (3) - 1997, 2003, 2015
 Rugby (36) - 1944, 1946, 1947, 1948, 1950, 1951, 1952, 1953, 1955, 1957, 1958, 1959, 1961, 1962, 1963, 1965, 1966, 1968, 1971, 1974, 1979, 1980, 1981, 1983, 1987, 1992, 1996, 1997, 2000, 2002, 2004, 2007, 2009, 2016, 2017, 2020
 Soccer (6) - 1996, 1998, 2003, 2008, 2009, 2017
 Swimming (21) - 1951, 1952, 1958, 1960, 1961, 1962, 1973, 1988, 1989, 1990, 1991, 1993, 1994, 1995, 1996, 1997, 1998, 1999, 2000, 2001, 2002
 Tennis Summer (2) - 1992, 2003
 Water Polo (4) - 1989, 1990, 1993, 1999

Notable alumni 

Alumni of Waverley College are known as Old Boys or Waverlians, and may elect to join the school's alumni association, the Waverley College Old Boys' Union that was established in December 1908.

Cadets 
The Waverley College Cadet Unit (WCCU) also known as WCACU was originally founded in 1911. The unit currently has over 340 members and offers a wide variety of leadership positions. Students in Year 8 are required to participate in the cadet program and are given the option to continue into Year 9 and thereafter. Attendance at Annual Promotion Courses are voluntary and result in the gaining of rank and responsibility within the unit structure.

See also 

 List of Catholic schools in New South Wales
 Catholic education in Australia

References

Further reading

External links 

 Official website

Educational institutions established in 1903
Catholic secondary schools in Sydney
Combined Associated Schools
Boys' schools in New South Wales
Junior School Heads Association of Australia Member Schools
Catholic primary schools in Sydney
1903 establishments in Australia
Congregation of Christian Brothers secondary schools in Australia
Waverley, New South Wales
Congregation of Christian Brothers primary schools in Australia